Lynne Marta, also credited as Lynn Marta, is a retired American actress and singer.

Career
Marta's first screen credit was in 1966 in an episode of the comedy series Gidget. She was a regular on the syndicated variety program The Lloyd Thaxton Show and on the anthology series Love, American Style (1969-1974). Her career was largely as a guest player on episodic television, and she has often made multiple appearances on the same series as different characters (including The F.B.I., Cannon, Medical Center, The Streets of San Francisco, Barnaby Jones, Trapper John, M.D., and Vega$).

During the mid-late 1970s, she appeared (as different characters) in three separate episodes of Starsky & Hutch. She appeared in episodes of ER, Caroline in the City, Designing Women, Gunsmoke, Matt Houston, Law & Order, Charlie's Angels, The Rockford Files, Kojak, Marcus Welby, M.D., and The Rookies. She has also appeared in the daytime soap operas Passions, The Young and the Restless, and Days of Our Lives.

Personal life
Born in Somerville, New Jersey, Lynne Marta is one of two daughters born to George Marta, a first-generation Italian-American, and his wife, Ruth.

In 1983, People magazine reported that Marta and actor David Soul had an "open relationship". The article explained, "All through the Starsky and Hutch years David and Lynne lived together but spent time with other people."

She was an earwitness to the murder of actress Rebecca Schaeffer in 1989.

Filmography
 1971 Red Sky at Morning as Venery Ann Cloyd
 1972 Joe Kidd as Elma
 1972 43: The Richard Petty Story as Lynda Petty
 1973 Genesis II as Harper-Smythe
 1975 Adams of Eagle Lake as Cindy
 1975 Starsky & Hutch as Cheryl
 1976 Help Me... I'm Possessed as Melanie Blackwood
 1976 Once an Eagle as Celia Harrodson
 1977 In the Glitter Palace as Ricki
 1980 Blood Beach as Jo
 1980 Homeward Bound as Mary Jo Lawson
 1984 Footloose as Lulu Warnicker
 1985 Crime of Innocence as Lucille (uncredited)
 1990 The First Power as Nun
 1990 Columbo: Uneasy Lies the Crown as Frances
 1990 3 Men and a Little Lady as Morgan, School Teacher
 1993 A Case for Murder as Marti Stevens
 1993 Message from Nam as Nurse #2
 1996 Race Against Time: The Search for Sarah as Matron
 1997 Sleeping with the Devil as Judge Eberhardt
 2002 Time of Fear as Mrs. LeDoux

References

External links

1940s births
American film actresses
Living people
Musicians from Somerville, New Jersey
Actresses from Somerville, New Jersey
21st-century American actresses
20th-century American actresses
20th-century American women singers
20th-century American singers
21st-century American women singers
21st-century American singers